Figuerism or Figuerismo is a political and ideological movement in Costa Rica of social democracy and democratic socialism initiated by José Figueres Ferrer, who exercised the presidency of Costa Rica on three occasions; as de facto ruler after the Costa Rican revolution between 1948 and 1949, and then as democratically elected president twice: 1953–1958 and 1970–1974. Several Costa Rican political parties proclaim themselves as continuators of figuerism and as their most faithful representatives, among them the National Liberation Party, Citizens' Action Party and the Patriotic Alliance, all of whom pay homage to the figure of José Figueres and have personalities in their ranks close to the former president Figueres and of figuerist extraction.

Figueres is reminded, among other things, of having respected the "Social Guarantees" (a series of social reforms beneficial to the popular classes enacted in the Calderón administration that were not repealed by Figueres after winning the war), for having abolished the army, approved women's suffrage, ended racial segregation (until 1949 blacks had no right to vote or leave certain areas) and the creation of the Costa Rican Institute of Electricity.

The centenary of his birth on September 25, 2006 was celebrated both by the government chaired by Oscar Arias of the National Liberation Party and in the Legislative Assembly by then main opposition force of the Citizen Action Party.

Ideology
José Figueres Ferrer proclaimed himself adherent of utopian socialism and developed a particularly Creole and native form of Costa Rican socialism difficult to define in international standards. He was a member of the Democratic Action group, in turn part of the Democratic Party opposed to the Christian socialist government of Rafael Ángel Calderón Guardia who was allied to the Costa Rican Communist Party and led the revolution against Calderón after the elections in 1948 were canceled by the Constitutional Congress when Calderón was defeated by the opposition candidate (and future ally of Calderón) Otilio Ulate arguing electoral irregularities, being commander of the so-called National Liberation Army that emerged victorious in the war of 48.

In 1953, the Center for the Study of National Problems and Democratic Action merged, giving birth to the National Liberation Party with Figueres as its first candidate and also its first democratically elected president. The Center was fed back from the social democratic thought of the time, particularly of Haya de la Torre. Figuerismo is not synonymous with liberationism, that is, the ideology that revolves around the National Liberation Party which has a varied archipelago of internal tendencies.

Parties
The political tradition of the National Liberation Party is known as "liberationism" (liberacionismo) and should not be confused with figuerismo, although this is one of the most important trends, different tendencies not always friendly with each other, such as arismo (linked to the Arias Sánchez family) and mongismo (to the Araya-Monge family), coexist within the PLN. 

Both Figueres Ferrer and his son José María Figueres Olsen were presidents of the Republic through the PLN. Other figures such as former deputy and former first lady Karen Olsen Beck and Figueres Ferrer's daughter, Muni Figueres, are still PLN members.

PLN's main rival, the Citizens' Action Party was founded by different personalities largely from the PLN, PAC has/had among its members personalities close to the figure, as one of its founders was writer Alberto Cañas Escalante who was close to Figueres Ferrer and former first lady Josette Altmann Borbón who was his daughter-in-law and wife of Figueres Olsen. Another figuerista is President Luis Guillermo Solís Rivera who left the PLN for the PAC following the disagreement with the support of the party to CAFTA. Solís Rivera used to belong to the figuerista trend along with Mariano Figueres Olsen (also Figueres Ferrer's son and president of the Patriotic Alliance party) and both left the ranks of the PLN at the same time, adhering to different but allied parties.

References

Eponymous political ideologies
Political history of Costa Rica 
Political movements in Costa Rica
Social democracy
Democratic socialism